Manikyakkallu is a 2011 Indian Malayalam-language drama film directed by M. Mohanan and starring Prithviraj Sukumaran and Samvrutha Sunil in the lead roles. The film is about a young teacher who arrives at a village school, who tries to make a definite change in student attitude. The movie is loosely based on the life story   of the students and teachers of the Government Brennen Higher Secondary School, Thalassery.

Plot
The story happens in a government school that had a glorious past but is now on the verge of being shut down as there are fewer than 60 students enrolled there. The teachers have no hope about making a difference to the situation and are busy with their personal activities.

Into this situation comes a  young teacher Vinayachandran, who makes a difference. Being a new teacher to the institution, it is unknown to all that he is the son of the school's former headmaster, who became a dishonor after all the students of the school failed in the SSLC exams and died heartbroken.

Cast

Soundtrack

References

External links
 Production notes - The Hindu
 Article - IndiaGlitz
 Article - OneIndia
 Article - The Hindu
 Article - Thalassery Education

2010s Malayalam-language films
Indian drama films
Indian films based on actual events
Films shot in Thalassery
2011 drama films
2011 films
Films scored by M. Jayachandran